DC Pierson  is an American comedian, author, and actor. He is best known for his involvement in the sketch and improvisational comedy group Derrick Comedy.

Early life and education
Pierson was born in Phoenix, Arizona. He attended New York University, joining a sketch comedy group, Hammerkatz NYU, in the fall of 2003. He worked as both assistant director and director during his three-year tenure with the group. Pierson graduated from NYU's Dramatic Writing Department in 2007 with a degree in writing for television. He also made three brief appearances on NBC's Community, on which his Derrick Comedy co-star Donald Glover plays a main character, as a Greendale Gazette member.

Career

Derrick Comedy
Pierson, along with other Hammerkatz alumni Donald Glover, Dominic Dierkes and Dan Eckman, formed the group Derrick Comedy after meeting at NYU. Pierson is both one of the principal actors and writers for Derrick Comedy.

Derrick Comedy has performed as an improvisational comedy group at the UCB Theatre in New York, but are best known for their sketches that appear on YouTube and CollegeHumor. Pierson has played roles including an emo teenager and a man making a plea to the Godfather. Pierson co-wrote Derrick Comedy's first feature-length film, Mystery Team, in which he also plays a self-described boy genius named Duncan.

Other works
On January 21, 2010, Pierson's first novel, The Boy Who Couldn't Sleep and Never Had To, was released on Random House. The story follows two high school students who are social outcasts. When one of the students, Eric, reveals that he never sleeps, the two boys end up on the run. His book came to a broad audience when he personally answered a high school student's questions regarding the work on Yahoo! Answers on August 13, 2012. On the page, the student asked for help in reviewing the book, a task that had been assigned to her by her teacher. She stated that lack of time, among other things, caused her to be unable to read the book. The author's reply to the student was first recognized by Techcrunch, and this coverage helped encourage more users to buy and read his book. One of Pierson's primary influences for his novel was the late J.D. Salinger. He is currently working on turning the book into a film, which will be directed by Dan Eckman. Pierson's second novel, Crap Kingdom, was released in 2013.

Childish Gambino is the rap moniker of his fellow Derrick Comedy member, Donald Glover. Pierson was featured on both of Childish Gambino's "I Am Just a Rapper" mixtapes, contributing verses to three different songs, "49ers (Orange Shirt)", "The Truth (Goth Star)", and "Different (Feel It All Around)". Pierson along with Nick Packard was also featured on Childish Gambino's "Assassins" from the 2008 mixtape Sick Boi. He was also featured along with Amber Petty on Donald Glover's "Starlight" from the 2009 mixtape Poindexter. He is also credited with the story told during "That Power" on Childish Gambino's Camp.

In 2014, Pierson had a brief cameo in Captain America: The Winter Soldier as Apple tech support Aaron Wilson. He reprised the character in 2021 in an advertisement series that doubled as a promotion for the Xbox Series X and The Falcon and the Winter Soldier, in which he is revealed to be the same character as "NoobMaster69" from Avengers: Endgame.

Filmography

Film

Television

References

External links
 
 A Lisa Simpson Kind of Planet: An Interview with DC Pierson

21st-century American comedians
Living people
New York University alumni
Upright Citizens Brigade Theater performers
Comedians from Arizona
Year of birth missing (living people)